KQMQ-FM (93.1 MHz) is a radio station based in Honolulu, Hawaii. The Pacific Media Group outlet broadcasts with an ERP of 100 kW. The station also transmits on Spectrum digital channel 868 for the entire state of Hawaii. It offers a proprietary blend of Hawaiian/Island Reggae and traditional Reggae music format branded as "HI93". The programming is led by local radio vet Kelsey Yogi. The station's studios are located in Downtown Honolulu and its transmitter is located near Akupu.

History
The station, which signed on the air on October 1, 1967, originally was an AOR outlet in its early days after it was acquired from Cecil Heftel and began broadcasting "album cut" music around 1976. Gene Davis was Program Director, Lee Abrams was consultant. Davis did morning drive. Among the other DJs were Ron Wood, Bob Cole, Noel Grey. It was the first station in Hawaii to include local contemporary music in its regular play list, thus giving exposure to groups like Kalapana, Cecilio and Kapono, and Keola and Kapono Beamer.

By the 1980s it inherited the Top 40 format from KKUA and would continue it into the 1990s. In 2000 it would switch to an All-80s & 90s format, as their format would move over to sister station KDDB. It was then known as "93.1 The Q". In 2005 they would return to Mainstream Top 40 with a Modern AC lean as "93.1 The Zone." During their tenure its listenership was 3.9 percent of Hawaii's listeners.

On February 4, 2011, KQMQ dropped their Top 40/CHR format and began stunting with all-Bob Marley music during the weekend until February 7, 2011, when it flipped to a format that consists of Reggae and Contemporary Hawaiian music, billing it as "93.1 Da Pā'ina." The move to a Reggae-based format make this the second of its kind in the United States. This was preceded by what proved to be a decoy media release that the new format would be Traditional Hawaiian "Nā Mele 93.1," a brand that is used at parent company Ohana Broadcasting's other outlets in Hawaii. February 6 was also Marley's birthday, which made this flip more interesting. According to PD Rick Thomas, "Pa’ina’s mission to is to have fun and play the reggae and island jams people really want to hear." Thomas launched with Big Teeze as station voice with Imaging Director John James providing initial launch package With this move, KQMQ will face competition from two other Hawaiian Contemporary outlets that also feature Reggae music in their presentation, KDNN and KCCN.

Pacific Media Group acquired the Ohana Broadcasting cluster in June 2019, bringing its station total across Hawai'i to 20 and giving it its first stations on O'ahu.
 
KQMQ-FM rebranded as "HI93" on March 9, 2020. The rebranding was made to match the similar “Hi 92.5” KLHI-FM on Kahului, Maui and “Hi 95” 95.9 KSRF, Poipu, Kaua’i.

Alumni
KQMQ has boasted some of the most famous radio talents in the market. Some names that occupied the morning drive slot include: Chris Hughes, Augie Tulba (Da Augie Radio Show), Kimo Leahi, Austin Vali, Tony Taylor, Scotty B, Bridgette Sarchino, Sam The Man, Hawaiian Ryan, Leikia, Dan Cooke, Michael Qseng (deceased) & Danielle Tucker (Morning Madness), Jeff Kino and Lois Miyashiro and Shawn Ho (The Morning Zoo), Justin Cruz, Wili Moku (deceased) with Wild Kyle the traffic guy, Laurie Ann Solomon, Cliff Richards (deceased) & Erika Engle, and Kari Steele.

Some other well-known radio personalities that worked other on-air shifts include: Brad Barrett, who also served as sister station KKUA Program Director, later moving to cross street competition KSSK-FM, Kimo Akane, Kriss Hart, Kevin "Bish" Bishop, Myk Powell, Lou Richards (actually he was on KKUA AM which became KQMQ AM), Michael W. Perry, Mark "Mars Frehley" Marolt, Jon Kealoha, Shawn Ho, Jon E. Blaze, Candace Cruise, Kurt Williams, Kathy With A "K", Timster, Bruddah Bryan, Roro, Lisa D. and Steve Kelly, and Mark Morgann in his first radio gig as the weekend SegueGuy.

Awards and achievements
During its second run as a Top 40/CHR, KQMQ FM was the first station in the U.S. and all other countries to play Linkin Park's "New Divide". This was certified by Mediabase 24/7. KQMQ also achieved the status of playing more music than any Honolulu radio station during the workday.

Former Logos

References

93.1 Da Pa'ina rebrands to "HI93"

HI93 finds Hawaii's Best Tattoo

External links
Hi 93 website

 https://radioinsight.com/headlines/185057/kqmq-honolulu-rebrands-as-hi-93-102-7-the-bomb-debuts-new-morning-show/ KQMQ-FM rebrand link
 

QMQ-FM
Hawaiian-music formatted radio stations
Radio stations established in 1967
1967 establishments in Hawaii
Contemporary hit radio stations in the United States